Park Forest-Chicago Heights School District 163 (SD163) is a school district headquartered in Park Forest, Illinois. It serves sections of Chicago Heights.

History
In 2016 the district had over 2,000 students. In 2019 the district had 1,838 students.

In 2019 a board member resigned but then remained on the school board, and there was a political controversy over the board's internal management. In response to a board member using an SD163-issued charge card to pay for $5,000 of expenses, the board passed a policy regulating the cards.

Curriculum
In 2019 SD163 and Chicago Arts Partnership in Education secured a $2.3 million grant to add arts education to the curriculum.

Schools
SD163 decided to have its upper schools focus on particular concepts.
 Grades 4-8
 Barack Obama School of Leadership and STEM
 Michelle Obama School of Technology and the Arts 
 In 2016 the school received its current gymnasium with stage, eight additional classrooms, and a multipurpose room. Co-principal Cheryl L. Muench stated that Michelle Obama School had a "relaxed atmosphere".
 Grades Kindergarten to 3
 21st Century Primary Center
 Blackhawk Primary Center
 Mohawk Primary Center
 Preschool
 Algonquin Pre-Kindergarten Center

References

External links
 Park Forest-Chicago Heights School District 163

School districts in Cook County, Illinois